Nizahon is a town in western Ivory Coast. It is a sub-prefecture of Guiglo Department in Cavally Region, Montagnes District.

Nizahon was a commune until March 2012, when it became one of 1126 communes nationwide that were abolished.

In 2014, the population of the sub-prefecture of Nizahon was 20,767.

Villages
The 4 villages of the sub-prefecture of Nizahon and their population in 2014 are:
 Béablo (5 140)
 Béhébo (3 832)
 Nizahon 1 (9 381)
 Nizahon 2 (2 414)

References

Sub-prefectures of Cavally Region
Former communes of Ivory Coast